C&A is a multinational of retail clothing stores, with European head offices in Vilvoorde, Belgium, and Düsseldorf, Germany. The company operates approximately 1,300 stores in Europe and approximately 300 stores in Brazil as well as websites for online shopping. It also licenses the C&A name for stores in Mexico and China, which are under different ownership. C&A's brands include Angelo Litrico, Avanti, Clockhouse, Here+There, Palomino, Rodeo (ski and snowboard clothes), Westbury, Yessica, Yessica Pure, and Your Sixth Sense.

The company name is derived from the initials its founders, Clemens (1818–1902) and August (1819–1892) Brenninkmeijer. The Brenninkmeijer family owns the C&A group through its Swiss company COFRA Group. The company's success has led the family to be among the wealthiest in the Netherlands, even though the Brenninkmeijer family live in Geneva and Zug, Switzerland.

History
The Brenninkmeyer family had traded in linen and textiles since the 17th century from Mettingen, Germany. In 1841, the company was founded in Sneek by brothers Clemens and August Brenninkmeijer as a Dutch textile company, later taking its company name from the initials of the founders. The family was very secretive, in part to avoid customs scrutiny, and upon reaching age 14, family members were given the choice of working for C&A or joining the Catholic priesthood. In 1906, Clemens' son, Bernard Joseph, started discounting in Amsterdam and, by 1910, there were ten C&A stores in the Netherlands.

In 1974, C&A was one of the sponsors of the 1974 FIFA World Cup and in 1978 Sponsored Cycling through Eddy Merckx's team taking over from Fiat France.

In 2000, due to competition from Tesco and Asda, and to expanding high street names such as H&M, Zara and Topshop, C&A announced its withdrawal from the British market, where it had been operating since 1922 and had 109 stores. The last UK retail stores closed in 2001. Primark bought 6 C&A stores.

In June 2009, C&A withdrew from the Argentinian market.

In the summer of 2010, Beyoncé released a clothing line, House of Deréon, in cooperation with C&A.

In May and June 2017, the company closed 4 stores in the Netherlands due to poor sales.

In February 2020, C&A Mexico was sold to Grupo Axo.

On 20 August 2020, C&A sold C&A China to Zhongke Tongrong Private Equity to operate the stores via franchising.

In 2021 and 2022, the company closed 70 stores and stated the goal of having half of its sales come from online channels by 2026.

In March 2022, the company shut its Canda brand, which produced formalwear, due to the decline in sales as a result of the COVID-19 pandemic.

In June 2022, C&A began selling clothing via Amazon.com.

In July 2022, it was discovered that C&A's Serbian division was the victim of customs fraud on the import of goods from China. The unpaid duties led to the Serbian division filing bankruptcy and closing its 14 stores.

Controversies

Alleged use of forced labor
In December 2021, the European Center for Constitutional and Human Rights filed a criminal complaint in a Dutch court against C&A and other brands, including Lidl and Hugo Boss, alleging that they benefited from and were complicit in the use of forced labour by Uyghurs in Xinjiang.

In popular culture
The Specials referenced C&A in "Man at C&A" on the 1980 album More Specials. The phrase "Man at C&A" was later used to typify someone who was unfashionable.

In an episode of the sitcom Only Fools and Horses, Del Boy tells his brother Rodney that when they become millionaires, their clothes will "come from Man at C&A".

The Belle and Sebastian song "Expectations" features a character who is given the choice between working at Debenhams and C&A "cause that's what they expect".

References

External links

 

1841 establishments in the Netherlands
Clothing retailers of Germany
Clothing brands of the Netherlands
Clothing companies of Belgium
Clothing companies of the Netherlands
CandA
Defunct retail companies of the United Kingdom
Dutch brands
Retail companies established in 1841
CandA